The 2021–22 Iowa State Cyclones women's basketball team represented Iowa State University during the 2021–22 NCAA Division I women's basketball season. The Cyclones were coached by Bill Fennelly, who was in his 27th season at Iowa State. They played their home games at Hilton Coliseum in Ames, Iowa as members of the Big 12 Conference.

Previous season 

The Cyclones finished the 2020–21 season 17–11, 12–6 in Big 12 play to finish in fourth place. The Cyclones fell in the quarterfinals of the Big 12 Tournament to fifth seed Texas. They qualified for the 2021 NCAA tournament as a seven seed, defeating 10 seed Michigan State in the first round before falling to two seed Texas A&M in the second round.

Roster

Schedule and results 

|-
!colspan=6 style=| Exhibition

|-
!colspan=6 style=| Regular Season

|-
!colspan=6 style=| Big 12 Tournament

|-
!colspan=6 style=| NCAA Women's Tournament

Rankings 

Coaches' Poll did not release a second poll at the same time as the AP.

See also 
2021–22 Iowa State Cyclones men's basketball team

References 

Iowa State Cyclones women's basketball seasons
Iowa State
Iowa State Cyclones
Iowa State Cyclones
Iowa State